Ama̧hiri-teri is the village and people of  Ya̧nomamö mythology thought to inhabit the desolate underworld, Hei tä bebi. According to Ya̧nomamö folklore they had originally inhabited the earth, Hei kä misi, but when a piece of Hedu kä misi (heaven) fell down it fell onto Ama̧hiri-teri, creating a hole and carrying the village and people through. As the only physical environment carried through was the Ama̧hiri-teri shabono (village) and gardens, the landscape is void of significant natural resources, forcing the Ama̧hiri-teri to turn to cannibalism.

The Ama̧hiri-teri people hunt the souls of the Ya̧nomamö living above, using spiritual forces to capture children. The children are taken into Hei tä bebi and their souls are devoured as food. In order to lessen this danger, Ya̧nomamö shamans are constantly vigilant, and regular rites are performed to fend the Ama̧hiri-teri off.

References

Sources

External links
 Chagnon, Napoleon A., Yanomamö: The Last Days of Eden (excerpts)

Yanomami mythology
Underworld